Hermann Weißenborn (10 September 1876 – 20 November 1959) was a German operatic baritone and voice teacher.

Born in Berlin, Weißenborn was trained musically mostly by Raimund von Zur Mühlen. He began a career as a concert and oratorio singer. He turned early to music education. He became one of the most sought-after singing teachers of his generation in Germany. From 1920 he taught at the Musikhochschule Berlin. Since 1922 he was head of the singing department of this university. Among his many well-known students were Joseph Schmidt, Dietrich Fischer-Dieskau, Elisabeth Höngen, Marga Höffgen, Hildegard Rütgers and Petre Munteanu.

Weißenborn died in Berlin at age 83.

References 

1876 births
1959 deaths
Singers from Berlin
German operatic baritones
20th-century German  male opera singers
Voice teachers
Academic staff of the Berlin University of the Arts